Wynyard may refer to:

Australia:
Wynyard, Sydney, the district of Sydney CBD around Wynyard railway station, Sydney
Wynyard Park, Sydney 
Wynyard, Tasmania
County of Wynyard, in the Murrumbidgee–Tumut region of New South Wales

Canada:
Wynyard, Saskatchewan, a town in east-central Saskatchewan

New Zealand:
Wynyard Quarter, a waterfront precinct within Auckland CBD

United Kingdom:
Wynyard, Hartlepool, a civil parish in County Durham
Wynyard, Stockton-on-Tees, a civil parish in County Durham
Wynyard Park, County Durham
Wynyard Woods a housing estate in Stockton-on-Tees
Wynyard School, a former school in Watford, Hertfordshire

People:
 Diana Wynyard (19061964), born Dorothy Isobel Cox; English stage and film actress
 Edward Buckley Wynyard (17881864), English-born Australian military figure and politician
 George Wynyard "Sherry" (18621944),  New Zealand rugby union player
 Henry Wynyard "Pie" (18631921), New Zealand rugby union player
 James Wynyard (19141942), New Zealand rugby union player
 Richard Wynyard, New Zealand rugby union and rugby league player 
 Sir Robert Henry Wynyard (18021864), New Zealand colonial administrator
 Jason Wynyard (fl. 2015), New Zealand woodchopper
 Tai Wynyard (b. 1998), New Zealand basketball player; son of Jason
 William Wynyard (British Army officer) (17591819), one time General Officer Commanding Northern District
 William Wynyard "Billy" (18821932), New Zealand rugby union and rugby league player